The 17th Lumières Awards ceremony, presented by the Académie des Lumières, was held on 13 January 2012. The ceremony was presided by Catherine Jacob. The Artist won the award for Best Film.

Winners and nominees

Winners are listed first and highlighted in bold.

See also
 37th César Awards
 2nd Magritte Awards

References

External links

 
 
 17th Lumières Awards at AlloCiné

Lumières Awards
Lumières
Lumières